The Chills are a New Zealand rock band that formed in Dunedin in 1980. The band is essentially the continuing project of singer/songwriter Martin Phillipps, who is the group's sole constant member. For a time in the 1990s, the act was billed as Martin Phillipps & The Chills. In the 1980s and 1990s, The Chills had some significant chart success in their homeland and were a cult band in other parts of the world as one of the earliest proponents of the Dunedin sound.

History

Early years and first breakup (1980–1983)
Singer-songwriter Martin Phillipps formed The Chills in 1980 with his sister Rachel Phillipps on keyboards and Jane Dodd on bass after the demise of his punk band, The Same. Also included in the initial lineup were guitarist Peter Gutteridge and drummer Alan Haig. Phillipps's earlier band, the Same, had formed in 1978 and performed alongside punk bands Toy Love and The Enemy.

The Chills were initially signed by Flying Nun Records and were one of the four bands recorded for the Dunedin Double EP in 1982. By this time, the band consisted of Martin Phillipps, Alan Haig, keyboard player Fraser Batts and bassist Terry Moore. One of the tracks recorded, "Kaleidoscope World", became a signature song for the band's early years.

Rachel Phillipps returned (replacing Batts) and Martyn Bull took over from Haig on drums in time for the band's first single "Rolling Moon", which was a chart hit in 1983. However, Bull's sudden illness caused the band to then take a year off.

Reformation and international success (1984–1992)
After Bull's death in July 1983 (from leukaemia), the Chills changed their name to A Wrinkle in Time, as Phillipps was initially unwilling to continue performing under a name associated with his late friend. The name change was brief, and although the band performed under the alternative name, no recordings were produced under it.

Once the Chills name had been reestablished, The Chills became essentially a solo project spearheaded by Martin Phillipps, the band's lead singer and sole songwriter. Band personnel turnover was near-constant—The Chills went through over 20 different lineup changes with Phillipps as the only constant member. Members of the band from 1984 on have included Terry Moore, Alan Haig, Peter Allison, David Kilgour, Steven Schayer, Martin Kean, Justin Harwood, Caroline Easther, Jimmy James Stephenson, Jillian Dempster, and Oli Wilson among others. Several of these musicians went on to further success in bands ranging from The Verlaines to Luna.

The band's first post-Wrinkle in Time release was the 1984 single "Pink Frost", which became the band's biggest hit to that time. It was initially recorded in 1982 by the three-piece band of Martin Phillipps, Terry Moore, and Martyn Bull, before receiving new overdubs in 1984. This single was followed by the #12-hit single "Doledrums", and then a six-song EP called The Lost EP. This EP did not feature any of the band's previous (or future) singles and peaked at #4 on the New Zealand singles charts in 1985. The Chills undertook their first European tour that same year.

In 1986, the band issued the minor international hit "I Love My Leather Jacket", recorded at The Point Studio by Danny Hyde. "I Love My Leather Jacket" was dedicated to late drummer, Bull, who had bequeathed the said item of clothing to Phillipps in his will. The Chills finally released their first album, Kaleidoscope World, in 1986; the album was a compilation of various previously released singles, EP tracks, and songs from the Dunedin Double EP.

The band released their first proper album, Brave Words, in 1987. The band spent most of 1987 (February through mid-December) promoting the album by touring Europe, interspersed with four July dates in New York and Boston. A full-fledged North American tour occurred in the fall of 1988; tour dates would be a regular part of the band's life for the next several years.

In 1990, the band were signed to a worldwide record deal with their music appearing on the Warner Brothers imprint Slash Records in North America.  Their 1990 album Submarine Bells included their biggest international hit, the whimsically titled "Heavenly Pop Hit". The tune was also a hit in the US, charting at #17 on the Billboard Alternative Airplay Chart; it remains their only American chart appearance. The group's follow-up album, 1992's Soft Bomb, featured a totally different Chills lineup (save for Phillipps), and spun off the hit "The Male Monster from the Id".

Second reformation (1995–present)

Phillipps announced the dissolution of the Chills after the Soft Bomb tour, and joined David Kilgour in a loosely organized covers band known as The Pop Art Toasters, which released a self-titled EP in 1994. Shortly thereafter, though, the 'Toasters dissolved, and Phillipps put together another Chills lineup and resumed gigging.

This seemingly constant turnover of personnel is often cited as one of several reasons for the band's lack of consistent "saleability", and is referred to by the local music scene as "the curse of the Chills". The "curse" struck again with the recording of the album Sunburnt in England, in the summer of 1995. Two band members were refused entry into the UK, so session musicians had to be recruited at the last moment. Dave Mattacks of Fairport Convention and XTC's Dave Gregory provided drum and bass work for the album, with Phillipps the only other credited musician (aside from guest keyboards played by producer Craig Leon). This album was issued in early 1996 under the group name Martin Phillipps and The Chills.

After that, the band again split, with Phillipps appearing in another one of David Kilgour's bands, the Heavy Eights. Nevertheless, Phillipps continued to recruit new Chills members for live shows and played at least a few shows as The Chills every year from 1997 on. For much of the late 1990s, though, Phillipps was laid low with hepatitis C, a side effect of drug addiction problems. He released an album of solo home demos (Sketch Book: Volume One) in 1999; the demos themselves dated from 1988–1995. In 2000, Secret Box, a three-CD box set of Chills live tracks, demos, radio sessions, and rarities was released.

In 2004, an eight-song Chills mini-album called Stand By was issued, the first all-new Chills material in nine years. Phillipps's album liner notes promised:   Despite Phillipps's claim, however, no new Chills album appeared for over a decade.

In May 2010, the band played two shows in Australia, their first shows outside New Zealand since 1996. Three years later, after another nine-year hiatus from the recording studio, a single newly recorded Chills track called "Molten Gold" was issued. The track, released on Martin Phillipp's 50th birthday (July 2, 2013), was a non-album 7” single with the rerecorded "Pink Frost 13" as a B-side.

In October 2015, the band issued Silver Bullets, their first album-length release in 19 years.

In February 2017, the band released the David Bowie song "Conversation Piece".

On September 14, 2018, the band released its seventh album, Snow Bound.

The Chills on film
The Chills have been the subject of numerous documentaries, predominantly produced for New Zealand TV.

In March 2019, a feature documentary exploring the history of the band and Martin Phillipps's contemporary struggle with hepatitis C, directed by Julia Parnell and Rob Curry premiered at SXSW before being released theatrically in New Zealand and Australia. It was broadcast in New Zealand on Prime TV.

Discography

Studio albums

Compilations

EPs

Singles

Timeline of personnel

References

Further reading 
 Davey, T. & Puschmann, H. (1996) Kiwi Rock. Dunedin: Kiwi Rock Publications. 
 Dix, J. (1988) Stranded in paradise: New Zealand Rock'n'Roll 1955–1988. Wellington: Paradise Publications. 
 Eggleton, D. (2003) Ready to Fly: The Story of New Zealand Rock Music. Nelson, NZ: Craig Potton Publishing. 
 Shepherd, R. (2016) In Love with These Times. Auckland: Harper Collins New Zealand.

External links 
 
 
 

 
APRA Award winners
Creation Records artists
New Zealand alternative rock groups
New Zealand indie rock groups
Flying Nun Records artists
Jangle pop groups
Dunedin Sound musical groups
Fire Records (UK) artists
Slash Records artists
Musical groups established in 1980
Musical groups disestablished in 1983
Musical groups reestablished in 1984
Musical groups disestablished in 1992
Musical groups reestablished in 1994
Musical groups disestablished in 1996
Musical groups reestablished in 1999